Widehem is a commune in the Pas-de-Calais department in the Hauts-de-France region of France.

Geography

History
Known and recorded as "Wodingahem" in 877, after a Germanic chief of the region who opposed Charlemagne.

Population

Places of interest
The neogothic church of St.Wulmer, dates from the sixteenth century.

Widehem is the site of a pioneering 6-turbine wind farm, that opened in 1999.

See also
Communes of the Pas-de-Calais department

References

Communes of Pas-de-Calais